Mutuelleville is a district of Tunis, the capital of Tunisia. It is located north of the downtown area, and borders Parc du Belvédère to the southwest. The main street through Mutuelleville is Avenue Jugurtha.

Mutuelleville is known as a more upper-class area of Tunis, and it is home to many of the city's foreign embassies and other diplomatic offices.  Other notable locations are the Lycée Pierre Mendès France, the university dormitories of Harroun Errachid and Fattouma Bourguiba, the Chedli Zouiten stadium, and the Sheraton Tunis hotel.

Notes

Citations

References

Diplomatic districts